The Slovenian Democratic Youth (SDM) is the youth section of the Slovenian Democratic Party (Slovenska demokratska stranka, SDS), a Slovenian center-right liberal conservative party. Since the mid-1990s, it has been the largest youth political organization in Slovenia.

It was founded  on 31 October 1989 as the Social Democratic Youth of Slovenia. In 1990, it was first political organization with demanding a referendum for independent Slovenia.

International relations 

SDM is a full member of the International Young Democrat  Union (IYDU), the Youth of the European People's Party (YEPP), and the Democrat Youth Community of Europe (DEMYC).

Chairmans 
Matej Makarovič (1989 - 1993)
Denis Sabadin (1993 - 1995) 
Petra Marolt (1995 - 1997) 
Anja Bah (1997 - 2001) 
Damjan Tušar (2001) 
Alenka Jeraj (2001 - 2006) 
Nikolaj Oblak (2006 - 2008) 
Gregor Horvatič (2008 - 2009)
Klement Perko (2009 - 2010)
Andrej Čuš (20111 - 2015)
Žan Mahnič (2015 - 2021)
Dominik Štrakl (2021 - 2023)
Simona Purkat (2023 -)

International Young Democrat Union
Politics of Slovenia